Cloyes-les-Trois-Rivières (literally 'Cloyes the Three Rivers') is a commune in the department of Eure-et-Loir, north-central France. The municipality was established on 1 January 2017 by merging the former communes of Cloyes-sur-le-Loir (the seat), Autheuil, Charray, Douy, La Ferté-Villeneuil, Le Mée, Montigny-le-Gannelon, Romilly-sur-Aigre and Saint-Hilaire-sur-Yerre.

Population

See also 
Communes of the Eure-et-Loir department

References 

Communes of Eure-et-Loir